Symmoca uniformella is a moth of the family Autostichidae. It is found in Portugal and Spain.

The wingspan is 20–21 mm. The forewings are light grey, dusted with brownish grey. The hindwings are grey.

References

Moths described in 1900
Symmoca
Taxa named by Hans Rebel